Grinnell Peninsula is a peninsula in northwestern Devon Island in Nunavut, Canada. It was discovered by the First Grinnell Expedition and named "Grinnell Land", after Henry Grinnell, the financier of Arctic explorations.

Sources
Arctic Institute of North America, Elisha Kent Kane, Arctic, v. 37, no. 2, June 1984, p. 178-179

External links
The Glacier Atlas of Canada

Peninsulas of Qikiqtaaluk Region
Devon Island